OFP can refer to:

 One Fiji Party, political party in Fiji founded in 2014
 Operation Flashpoint (series), a video game franchise
 Operation Flashpoint: Cold War Crisis, a 2001 Czech video game
 Operational Flight Program (military aviation)
 Overall fibrinolytic potential, a parameter of the overall hemostatic potential test
 Overall Future Potential, a scouting assessment used in baseball to rank young players' potential in the major leagues